Janet Werner (born 1959) is a Canadian artist based in Montreal. Her work is known for its incisive and playful depictions of female figures, raising questions about the nature of the subject in painting.

Biography 
Janet Werner was born in 1959 in Winnipeg, Manitoba, and currently resides in Montreal, Quebec, where she teaches at Concordia University. Werner studied at the Maryland Institute College of Art in Baltimore, and, in 1985 she received her Bachelor of Fine Arts. Later, she studied at Yale University in New Haven, Connecticut, where she received her Masters of Fine Arts in 1987. From 1987 to 1999 she taught painting and drawing at the University of Saskatchewan, in Saskatoon, Saskatchewan.

Work 
Werner is known primarily for her large scale fictional portraits. She has been focusing on the genre since 1997. Werner explores themes of subjectivity and desire by producing composites of found images. Recent paintings have explored painting's relationship to ideas of realism and the photograph. It can be said that the artist uses painting to deconstruct the ubiquity of the photographic image.

Collections
Musée national des beaux-arts du Québec  
Leonard and Bina Ellen Art Gallery, Montréal
Mackenzie Art Gallery
Regina Owens Art Gallery, Sackville, New Brunswick 
Remai Modern (Formerly, Mendel Art Gallery), Saskatoon 
Dunlop Art Gallery, Regina 
Owens Art Gallery, Mount Allison University, Sackville 
Winnipeg Art Gallery  
Kenderdine Art Gallery, University of Saskatchewan, Saskatoon

Exhibitions
Werner exhibited at the Art Gallery of Guelph in 2019.

Selected exhibitions
 1989, Paintings, AKA Gallery, Saskatoon, Saskatchewan. 
 1989 Rehearsing the World, Plug In Inc, Winnipeg, Manitoba. 
 1990. 1990 Paintings, Garnet Press Gallery, Toronto, Ontario. 
 1991 Reflections on Language and the Appearance of Things, Mendel Art Gallery, Saskatoon, Saskatchewan. 
1991 Reflections on Language and the Appearance of Things, Illingworth Kerr Gallery, Calgary, Alberta. 
1992 Reflections on Language and the Appearance of Things, Dunlop art Gallery, Regina, Saskatchewan.
1994 Lingua, la Central, Galerie Powerhouse, Montreal, Quebec.
1995 Scat, Galerie Axe NEO 7, Hull, Quebec. 
1995 figures and fields, Sir Wilfred Grenfell Gallery, Corner Brook, Newfoundland. 
1995, Janet Werner / Katherine Sellars* Eye Level Gallery, Halifax, Nova Scotia. 
1996, Slow Pictures, Robert Birch Gallery, Toronto. 
1997, Listen, AKA Gallery, Saskatoon, Saskatchewan. 
1997, Trance *, Mendel Gallery, Saskatoon, Saskatchewan (catalogue).
1997, Lucky, Southern Alberta Art Gallery, Lethbridge, Alberta (catalogue)
1998, Lucky, Owens Art Gallery, Sackville, New Brunswick.
1998, trust, Optica, Montreal, Quebec. 
1999, Janet Werner, Paul kuhn Gallery, Calgary, Alberta. 
1999, Janet Werner, Tableau Vivant Gallery, Toronto, Ontario. 
1999, trust, Art Gallery of Mississauga, Mississauga, Ontario. 
1999, Janet Werner, Tableau Vivant Gallery, Toronto, Ontario.
1999, Janet Werner, Paul Kuhn Gallery, Calgary, Alberta.

Bibliography

Notes

External links 
 Janet Werner: By All Appearances 
 Janet Werner gets real: Piece and parcel 
 Janet Werner "Who's Sorry Now at Parisian Laundry
 Women and Animals

1959 births
Living people
Artists from Winnipeg
Canadian women painters
20th-century Canadian women artists